The 1979 Challenge Cup was a series of international ice hockey games between the Soviet Union national ice hockey team and a team of All-Stars from the National Hockey League.  The games were played on February 8, 10, and 11 at Madison Square Garden in New York City. It replaced the NHL's all-star festivities for the 1978–79 NHL season. The Soviets defeated the NHL All-Stars two games to one.

The team of All-Stars from the National Hockey League included 23 Canadians and three Swedish players. Bobby Orr commenting in the post-game interviews after game two, accidentally called the NHL All-Stars "Team Canada" (because of the number of Canadians on the roster). The Challenge Cup, unlike its predecessor, the Summit Series, included non-Canadian born players in the NHL rosters.

The NHL All-Stars team was coached by Scotty Bowman, and the Soviet Union national team was coached by Viktor Tikhonov.

NHL All-Stars roster

Soviet Union roster

Uniforms 
The NHL vastly simplified their white All-Star uniforms, removing most of the striping and stars. The NHL shield on the front was enlarged, while the logos on the shoulders remained the same. The striping was reduced to two thin stripes, orange over black, separated by a thin white stripe. The names on the back remained in black with orange trim, and the numerals remained orange with black trim.

The Soviet team used their standard red national uniforms, which they also used when touring against the teams of the World Hockey Association (while billed as the "Soviet All-Stars"). The jerseys featured two white stripes at the waistline - one thin stripe over a wider stripe studded with red diamonds. The sleeve stripes followed a similar pattern, but without the diamonds on the wide stripes, and an additional white stripe below the wide band. While the Soviet team normally used Cyrillic script on its uniforms, the names on the back of the jerseys for the Challenge Cup were romanized for the event. The front of the jerseys retained the Cyrillic СССР initials.

Game log

Game 1 
Date: Thursday February 8, 1979
Location: New York City: Madison Square Garden
Attendance: 17,438

Score 
NHL All-Stars 4 - Soviet Union 2

Goals 
(1st Period) NHL 1-0 USSR 0:16 NHL All-Stars- Guy Lafleur (Bobby Clarke, Steve Shutt) 
(1st Period) NHL 2-0 USSR 6:22 NHL All-Stars- Mike Bossy (Gilbert Perreault, Guy Lafleur) (PP)
(1st Period) NHL 2-1 USSR 11:25 Soviet Union- Boris Mikhailov (Valeri Vasiliev, Valeri Kharlamov) (PP)  
(1st Period) NHL 3-1 USSR 15:48 NHL All-Stars- Bob Gainey (Bill Barber, Barry Beck)
(2nd Period) NHL 4-1 USSR 8:14 NHL All-Stars- Clark Gillies (Mike Bossy)
(3rd Period) NHL 4-2 USSR 3:02 Soviet Union- Vladimir Golikov (Aleksandr Golikov, Sergei Makarov)

Penalties 
(1st Period) 0:59 Soviet Union- Viktor Zhluktov 2:00 min (Hooking)
(1st Period) 5:13 Soviet Union- Vladimir Petrov 2:00 min (Hooking)
(1st Period) 8:31 NHL All-Stars- Lanny McDonald 2:00 min (High Sticking)
(1st Period) 10:59 NHL All-Stars- Clark Gillies 2:00 min (Charging)
(1st Period) 12:21 Soviet Union- Viktor Zhluktov 2:00 min (Interference) 
(2nd Period) 10:48 Soviet Union- Gennadiy Tsygankov 2:00 min (Holding)

Shots on Goal 
NHL All-Stars: 10 - 9 - 5 24
Soviet Union:   6 - 5 - 9 20

Goalies 
60:00 NHL All-Stars- Ken Dryden (18/20) 2 goals against
60:00 Soviet Union- Vladislav Tretiak (20/24) 4 goals against

Officials 
Referee- Bob Myers 
Linesman- Ray Scapinello 
Linesman- John D'Amico

Game 2 
Date: Saturday February 10, 1979 
Location: New York City: Madison Square Garden
Attendance: 17,438

Score 
NHL All-Stars 4 - Soviet Union 5

Goals 
(1st Period) NHL 0-1 USSR 8:10 Soviet Union- Sergei Kapustin (Sergei Starikov)
(1st Period) NHL 1-1 USSR 13:35 NHL All-Stars- Mike Bossy (Bryan Trottier, Clark Gillies) (PP)
(1st Period) NHL 2-1 USSR 18:21 NHL All-Stars- Bryan Trottier (Clark Gillies, Mike Bossy)
(2nd Period) NHL 3-1 USSR 0:27 NHL All-Stars- Gilbert Perreault (Darryl Sittler) 
(2nd Period) NHL 3-2 USSR 2:05 Soviet Union- Mikhail Varnakov (Aleksandr Skvortsov) 
(2nd Period) NHL 4-2 USSR 5:06 NHL All-Stars- Larry Robinson (Guy Lafleur, Marcel Dionne)
(2nd Period) NHL 4-3 USSR 17:02 Soviet Union- Boris Mikhailov (Vladimir Petrov, Valeri Vasiliev) (PP)
(2nd Period) NHL 4-4 USSR 7:47 Soviet Union- Sergei Kapustin (Viktor Zhluktov)
(3rd Period) NHL 4-5 USSR 1:31 Soviet Union- Vladimir Golikov (Sergei Makarov)

Penalties 
(1st Period) 12:32 Soviet Union- Vladimir Kovin 2:00 min (Cross-Checking)
(1st Period) 15:13 NHL All-Stars- Gilbert Perreault 2:00 min (Holding)
(2nd Period) 8:04 NHL All-Stars- Börje Salming 2:00 min (Interference)
(2nd Period) 15:07 NHL All-Stars- Barry Beck 2:00 min (Boarding)

Shots on Goal 
NHL All-Stars: 5 -  5 -  6 16
Soviet Union:  7 - 14 - 10 31

Goalies 
60:00 NHL All-Stars- Ken Dryden (26/31) 5 goals against
60:00 Soviet Union- Vladislav Tretiak (12/16) 4 goals against

Officials 
Referee- Viktor Dombrovski 
Linesman- Matt Pavelich 
Linesman- Ron Finn

Game 3 
Date: Sunday February 11, 1979
Location: New York City: Madison Square Garden
Attendance: 17,545

Score 
NHL All-Stars 0 - Soviet Union 6

Goals 
(2nd Period) NHL 0-1 USSR 5:47 Soviet Union- Boris Mikhailov (Aleksandr Golikov) 
(2nd Period) NHL 0-2 USSR 7:44 Soviet Union- Viktor Zhluktov (Helmuts Balderis, Valeri Vasiliev) (PP) 
(3rd Period) NHL 0-3 USSR 8:44 Soviet Union- Helmuts Balderis (Irek Gimayev) 
(3rd Period) NHL 0-4 USSR 10:21 Soviet Union- Vladimir Kovin (Aleksandr Skvortsov, Mikhail Varnakov) 
(3rd Period) NHL 0-5 USSR 12:44 Soviet Union- Sergei Makarov (Sergei Kapustin) 
(3rd Period) NHL 0-6 USSR 14:46 Soviet Union- Aleksandr Golikov

Penalties 
(2nd Period) 6:27 NHL All-Stars- Don Marcotte 2:00 min (Elbowing)
(2nd Period) 10:48 Soviet Union- Valeri Vasiliev 2:00 min (Holding)
(2nd Period) 12:27 Soviet Union- Vladimir Myshkin 2:00 min (Roughing) (served by Irek Gimaev)
(2nd Period) 12:27 NHL All-Stars- Bryan Trottier 2:00 min (Roughing)
(3rd Period) 14:22 Soviet Union- Boris Mikhailov 2:00 min (Holding)

Shots on Goal 
NHL All-Stars: 7 - 7 - 10 24
Soviet Union:  6 - 6 -  7 19

Goalies 
60:00 NHL All-Stars- Gerry Cheevers (13/19) 6 goals against
60:00 Soviet Union- Vladimir Myshkin (24/24) 0 goals against

Officials 
Referee- Andy Van Hellemond 
Linesman- Leon Stickle 
Linesman- Claude Bechard

Broadcasters 
In the United States, Game 2, which was held on a Saturday afternoon, was shown on CBS as part of CBS Sports Spectacular. The network refused to expand CBS Sports Spectacular to carry the game in full so instead, the show came on during the second intermission, showed taped highlights of the first two periods, and then showed the final period live. The lead-in to Sports Spectacular was The World's Strongest Man. The then-CBS affiliate in Boston, the old WNAC-TV, broadcast a local college hockey game that led into Sports Spectacular.

The network, the show and their sponsors had a problem with the rink board advertising that the NHL sold at Madison Square Garden, and refused to allow them to be shown on television. As a result, CBS viewers were unable to see the far boards above the yellow kickplate, and could only see players' skates when the play moved to that side of the ice. Games 1 and 3 were shown on the NHL Network, where the advertising was no problem.

Dan Kelly and Lou Nanne were the commentators for CBS while Dick Stockton served as the host.

References

External links 
 Challenge Cup 1979 on legendsofhockey.net 
 Challenge Cup 1979 rosters and stats

International ice hockey competitions hosted by the United States
Challenge Cup
Challenge Cup
Soviet Union national ice hockey team games
Challenge Cup
February 1979 sports events in the United States
Challenge Cup
Ice hockey competitions in New York City
1970s in Manhattan
Madison Square Garden